Jonah Williams (August 17, 1995) is an American football nose tackle for the Los Angeles Rams of the National Football League (NFL). He played college football at Weber State.

College career
Williams originally signed to play college football at Weber State University, which was the only school to offer him a scholarship, in 2013 after considering offers from Boise State and Utah State to join their programs as a preferred walk-on. After graduating from high school, he served a Latter-Day Saint mission in São Paulo, Brazil and did not enroll at Weber State until December 2015. Williams was a four year starter for the Weber State Wildcats. He finished his collegiate career with 194 total tackles, 28 tackles for loss, and 15 sacks with three forced fumbles and three fumble recoveries in 54 games played.

Professional career

Los Angeles Rams
Williams was signed by the Los Angeles Rams as an undrafted free agent following the 2020 NFL Draft on April 26, 2020. He was waived on September 4, 2020, during final roster cuts, and was subsequently signed to the team's practice squad one day later. Williams signed a reserve/futures contract with the team on January 18, 2021.

Williams made the Rams' 53-man roster out of training camp to start the 2021 season. He played in eight games before being waived on November 2, 2021.

Minnesota Vikings
On November 3, 2021, Williams was claimed off waivers by the Minnesota Vikings, but was waived the next day after failing his physical.

Los Angeles Rams (second stint)
On November 9, 2021, the Rams signed Williams to their practice squad.  Williams won his first Super Bowl ring when the Rams defeated the Cincinnati Bengals in Super Bowl LVI. 

On February 15, 2022, Williams signed a reserve/future contract with the Rams.

References

External links
 Weber State Wildcats bio
 Los Angeles Rams bio

1995 births
Living people
American football defensive ends
Los Angeles Rams players
Minnesota Vikings players
Players of American football from Idaho
Players of American football from Washington (state)
Sportspeople from Puyallup, Washington
Weber State Wildcats football players